Buffalo County is a county in the U.S. state of South Dakota. As of the 2020 census, the population was 1,948. Its county seat is Gann Valley which, at 14 people, is the least populous county seat in the United States. The county was created in 1864, and was organized in 1871 as part of the Dakota Territory.

In 2010, the center of population of South Dakota was located in eastern Buffalo County. The Crow Creek Indian Reservation, inhabited by the Crow Creek Sioux Tribe, makes up the majority of Buffalo County.

According to the 2013 Small Area Income and Poverty Estimates of the US Census Bureau, about 41% of county residents live in poverty, making it the fifth-poorest county in South Dakota. This is a far higher poverty rate than the national poverty rate of 15.8%. Median household income in 2013 was $21,572, making it the lowest-earning county in South Dakota and the United States.

In March 2019, the county unemployment rate was 3.9%; its ten-year peaks occurred in December 2006 (18.1%) and December 2009 (17.2%). , many homes lack kitchens and indoor plumbing.

Geography
The Missouri River flows southerly along the county's western boundary. The county terrain consists of semi-arid rolling hills, generally sloping to the south and east. Some area is devoted to agriculture. The south and west parts of the county are drained by Crow Creek, which discharges into the river at the county's SW corner.

Major highways

 South Dakota Highway 34
 South Dakota Highway 45
 South Dakota Highway 47
 South Dakota Highway 50

Adjacent counties

 Hand – northeast
 Jerauld – east
 Brule – south
 Lyman – west
 Hyde – northwest

Protected Areas

 Pease State Game Production Area

Lakes
 Bedashosha Lake
 Lake Francis Case (part)
 Lake Sharpe (part)

History
As first organized, the county occupied an extensive area, bounded on the north by Canada, southwest and west by the Missouri River, having Montana for a part of its northwest boundary, and comprising a large portion of the "Plateau du Coteau du Missouri", and a part of the Miniwakan or Devil's Lake. Thus, its original boundary also contained a portion of the future North Dakota, which became a separate unit when the Dakota Territory was admitted into the Union in 1889 as two separate states.

Demographics
As of the 2010 United States census, there were 1,912 people, 532 households, and 407 families in the county. The racial makeup of the county was 84.0% Native American, 14.8% white, 0.2% black or African American, 0.1% Asian, 0.0% from other races, and 0.9% from two or more races. Those of Hispanic or Latino origin made up 1.8% of the population. In terms of ancestry, 5.6% were German, and 0.0% were American.

Of the 532 households, 55.6% had children under the age of 18 living with them, 33.1% were married couples living together, 33.1% had a female householder with no husband present, 23.5% were non-families, and 19.0% of all households were made up of individuals. The average household size was 3.59 and the average family size was 4.06. The median age was 25.0 years.

The median income for a household in the county was $27,926 and the median income for a family was $28,333. Males had a median income of $38,920 versus $18,542 for females. The per capita income for the county was $11,410. About 44.4% of families and 49.3% of the population were below the poverty line, including 58.2% of those under age 18 and 36.3% of those age 65 or over.

Communities

Census-designated places 

 Gann Valley (county seat)
 Fort Thompson

Unincorporated communities 

 Crow Creek
 North Buffalo
 Shelby
 Southeast Buffalo

Township
 Elvira

Politics
In 2016, Hillary Clinton won the votes in Buffalo County due to support from Native Americans. Democratic Party nominees have won every presidential election since 1956 except the 1980 and 1984 elections, which Ronald Reagan won.

See also

 National Register of Historic Places listings in Buffalo County, South Dakota

Further reading
  Part of a series on South Dakota counties.

References

 
South Dakota counties on the Missouri River
1871 establishments in Dakota Territory
Populated places established in 1871